Noel James Kyle Anderson (14 September 1987 – 24 August 2021) was an Australian professional darts player who played within the Professional Darts Corporation (PDC) from 2012 to 2021. He won the 2017 Auckland Darts Masters tournament.

Career
He started playing darts at the age of six and had competed in tournaments since he was nine. He first became interested in the game watching his father play. Anderson was an Aboriginal man of Noongar origin. Anderson qualified for the 2013 PDC World Darts Championship by winning the Oceanic Masters. He lost to Steve Beaton 3–0 in the first round after he missed two opportunities to take each of the opening two sets. Anderson dominated in the DPA's 2013 Australian Grand Prix season by winning seven events to top the Order of Merit. This secured him a place in the Sydney Darts Masters and the 2014 World Championship. He was drawn to play against 16–time world champion Phil Taylor in Sydney, but was defeated 6–1. At 2–1 down to Ian White in the first round of the World Championship, Anderson became the seventh player to throw a nine-dart finish in the history of the event. It was the second nine darter in less than an hour, after Terry Jenkins had also hit one, meaning the £30,000 prize money was shared. However, it was the last leg that he won during the match, as he was defeated 3–1. Anderson stated after the match that he hoped his performance would help raise the profile of darts in Australia.

Anderson entered the 2014 Q School in an attempt to earn a two-year PDC tour card and succeeded on the first day by winning seven matches, culminating in a 5–3 win over Keegan Brown. He stated that if he could get sponsorship he would move to the UK to play the full schedule of events, which he did a few months later by moving to Nottingham. Anderson qualified for his first UK Open but lost 5–4 against Kevin McDine in the opening round. He reached the semi-finals of a PDC event for the first time in April at the sixth Players Championship by beating seven-time major winner James Wade 6–3 in the quarters. Anderson faced Ian White and lost 6–1, with his solitary leg coming via a 140 checkout. In the opening round of the Perth Darts Masters he was whitewashed 6–0 by Michael van Gerwen. A week later, Anderson came from 3–0 down against Raymond van Barneveld at the Sydney Darts Masters to win 6–5 and set up an all Australian quarter-final with Simon Whitlock. Anderson stormed into a 3–0 lead, and went on to record the most significant win of his career 8–3. His run came to an end when he lost 10–4 to Phil Taylor in the semi-finals. A further quarter-final appearance at the 16th Players Championship followed, but Anderson lost 6–1 against Stephen Bunting.

2015
Anderson defeated Steve Beaton 3–0 in the first round of the 2015 World Championship, a complete reversal of their meeting at the same stage of the event two years prior. Anderson lost three consecutive sets from 2–1 ahead in the next round against Andy Hamilton to exit the tournament with a 4–2 defeat. He entered the top 64 on the Order of Merit for the first time after the event as he was ranked world number 55. Anderson had a good UK Open as he saw off Terry Temple, as well as recent defectors from the BDO Alan Norris and James Wilson to play Mervyn King in the fifth round. Anderson led 8–7, but his scoring power deserted him as he was unable to set up a match winning double in the next two legs to be edged out 9–8. One semi-final and two quarter-final showings on the Pro Tour has seen Anderson qualify for the World Matchplay through the Pro Tour Order of Merit. In his debut in the event he was 8–7 behind James Wade with all 15 legs going on throw. Anderson missed four darts for the next leg and would lose 10–7. He received an invite to the World Series of Darts Finals and exited in the first round 6–4 against Dave Chisnall.

2016
A 3–0 win over Brendan Dolan saw Anderson whitewash a seeded player in the first round of the World Championship for the second year in a row. He was 2–0 ahead of Vincent van der Voort in the second round, but went on to be eliminated 4–2. Anderson reached his first major PDC quarter-final at the UK Open by defeating Andy Hamilton, James Wilson and Benito van de Pas. In the quarter-final he was thrashed 10–0 by Jelle Klaasen. At the second Players Championship event he came close to playing in his first Pro Tour final, but was edged out in the semi-finals 6–5 by Michael van Gerwen after missing one match dart. Anderson and Simon Whitlock knocked out Germany and Denmark at the World Cup to meet the Netherlands in the quarter-finals. After Whitlock lost to Van Gerwen it meant Anderson needed to beat Raymond van Barneveld to keep Australia in the event and he did so 4–3. In the deciding doubles match, the Dutch pair threw an 11 dart leg to win 4–3.

In the quarter-finals of the Austrian Darts Open, Anderson knocked out Van Gerwen 6–4 and then went 4–1 up on Phil Taylor and for the second time that year missed one match dart to reach the final as Taylor won 6–5. After seeing off Vincent van der Voort 10–4, Anderson and Van Gerwen met again, this time in the second round of the World Matchplay, with the world number one winning 11–3. He also reached the second round of the World Grand Prix by beating Cristo Reyes 2–1 in sets, but lost 3–1 to Gary Anderson. In the European Championship, Anderson defeated Dave Chisnall and James Richardson before losing 10–5 to Peter Wright in the quarter-finals. Anderson was then forced to withdraw from the Players Championship Finals and the 2017 World Championship due to being unable to obtain a UK Visa.

2017: Auckland Masters triumph
Anderson returned to the UK in time for the start of the 2017 season. He won his first Players Championship title at the 17 event of the 2017 PDC Pro Tour, beating Kevin Painter in the final. He then went on to win the 2017 Auckland Darts Masters, his first televised title, beating Corey Cadby to win the event.

Anderson made the semi-final of the 2017 European Championship, and hit a nine-dart finish against Michael van Gerwen before losing in a last-leg decider.

2018–2021
Anderson continued playing on the tour through 2018 and 2019, but was unable to win another event. After beginning the 2020 season, he returned to Australia in March following the suspension of events due to the COVID-19 pandemic and did not return to the tour, choosing to resign his card prior to the start of the 2021 tour so that he could stay with his family for the birth of his second child.

Personal life and death
Kyle’s older brother Beau is also a professional Darts player, however Beau left the PDC Tour in 2017.

Kyle came from an Aboriginal background and was extremely proud of this. This was reflected in his nickname ‘The Original’ (Short for Aboriginal).

Anderson moved from Australia to Nottingham, England, when he became a professional darts player. During the COVID-19 pandemic, he returned to Australia. Anderson was a diabetic, and also had COVID-19 in 2020.

His death was announced on 24 August 2021; he was 33 years old. Cause of death was kidney failure. At the time of his death, he had been in hospital being treated for kidney failure.

Following their victory at the 2022 World Cup of Darts, Australia’s players Simon Whitlock and Damon Heta dedicated their success to Anderson who had represented his country in the tournament four times before his death.

World Championship results

PDC
 2013: First round (lost to Steve Beaton 0–3)
 2014: First round (lost to Ian White 1–3)
 2015: Second round (lost to Andy Hamilton 2–4)
 2016: Second round (lost to Vincent van der Voort 2–4)
 2018: Second round (lost to Raymond van Barneveld 1–4)
 2019: Third round (lost to Nathan Aspinall 1–4)
 2020: Second round (lost to Steve Beaton 1–3)
Source:

Career finals

PDC World Series finals: 1 (1 title)

Performance timeline 

Source:

Nine-dart finishes

Source:

References

External links

1987 births
2021 deaths
Australian darts players
Indigenous Australian sportspeople
Noongar people
Professional Darts Corporation former tour card holders
World Series of Darts winners
PDC ranking title winners
Darts players who have thrown televised nine-dart games
PDC World Cup of Darts Australian team
Australian expatriate sportspeople in England
21st-century Australian people